Justin Smith (born February 4, 2003) is a soccer player who plays as a defensive midfielder for Ligue 2 club US Quevilly-Rouen Métropole, on loan from Nice. Born in France, he has represented Canada at youth international level.

Early life
Born in France to Canadian parents, Smith began playing soccer at age seven with Voisins FC. After his U14 season, he departed Voisins and joined the Paris Saint-Germain Academy, where he played until the U17 level. In 2019, he joined the Nice youth system. At the Tournoi National U17 de QRM, he helped Nice finish fourth, being named the second best player of the tournament.

Club career
In June 2021, he signed his first professional contract with Nice. After featuring extensively in their preseason, during the 2021–22 season, he played with Nice II in the fifth-tier Championnat National 3. On August 14, he was called up to the first team for the first time, for a match against Lille, where he was an unused substitute. That season, he featured as a unused substitute for the first team in ten Ligue 1 matches and one Coupe de France match, but did not make an appearance.

On July 1, 2022, he joined Ligue 2 side Quevilly-Rouen on loan for the season. He debuted for the second team in the Championnat National 3, scoring a goal in the team's first game of the season on August 28 against SU Dives-Cabourg. Smith made his first league appearance for the first team against Guingamp on February 3, 2023.

International career
In April 2022, Smith accepted a call-up to a Canada U20 camp ahead of two friendlies against Costa Rica. In June 2022, he was named to the  roster for the 2022 CONCACAF U-20 Championship. Smith served as team captain during the tournament, appearing in all four of the team's matches.

Career statistics

Club

References

External links

2003 births
Living people
Footballers from Paris
Canadian soccer players
Canada men's youth international soccer players
French footballers
French people of Canadian descent
Association football defenders
Association football midfielders
Championnat National 3 players
OGC Nice players
US Quevilly-Rouen Métropole players